Brandi Lynn Glanville (formerly Cibrian, born November 16, 1972) is an American television personality. She is best known for appearing on the reality television series The Real Housewives of Beverly Hills (2011–2016) and seasons two and four of The Real Housewives Ultimate Girls Trip (2022–2023). She also hosts a podcast called Brandi Glanville Unfiltered and has appeared on television shows Celebrity Apprentice, both the British and American version of Celebrity Big Brother, Famously Single, and My Kitchen Rules. Glanville has released two books, Drinking and Tweeting: And Other Brandi Blunders (2013) and Drinking and Dating (2014), which became New York Times Best Sellers.

Early life
Glanville was born in Salinas, California and raised in Sacramento, California as the middle child of Judith (née Swinehart) and Guy Glanville. She has said her father grew marijuana, and she would sell it as she got older, admitting on Celebrity Big Brother that with her siblings, older sister Tricia, and younger brother Michael, she had blackmailed her father in order to obtain money. Her father worked three jobs to support the family, such as working at a grocery store and gas station. Her mother worked as a housekeeper. She attended Willow Rancho Baptist School and Gloria Dei Luther and graduated from John F. Kennedy High School.

Career

Fashion
At the age of 16, Glanville moved to Paris, France, and began modeling. She was signed to Elite Model Management and worked in Hamburg, Munich, Los Angeles, New York and Tokyo. By the next year, she was taking part in Paris runway shows. She has appeared in several magazines, including Glamour, Cosmopolitan, NW and Beverly Hills Lifestyle Magazine. She appeared on the magazine cover of UK's The Times in January 2014. Glanville has worked for well-known brands including Valentino, Versace, Chanel, Giorgio Armani, and Gucci. She has appeared in a commercial for Coors Light.

In December 2012, she launched a clothing line called "Brand B", which was sold exclusively on Amazon. Glanville's T-shirt line was launched in her official online store in 2014. The tops feature slogans such as "Medicated" and "It's Not Fun To Be Sober" and are priced between $25 to $30.

Television
In 2011, Glanville appeared on the second season of the Bravo reality series The Real Housewives of Beverly Hills. She made several appearances throughout the season as a "Friend of the Housewives", and on the reunion episode. She revealed to radio host Howard Stern that she made $18,000 as a part-time cast member during her first season on the show.

The following year, she and Yolanda Hadid joined the cast as housewives for its third season. She was fired from the series after its fifth season in 2015

Glanville appeared in guest capacities in the show's sixth, ninth and tenth seasons. Glanville stated she was surprised she was not invited back to the Season 10 reunion episode and Season 11 of the show as she was the source of a lot of the season's storylines due to her alleged affair with cast member Denise Richards.

In 2022, Glanville appeared on Season 2 of The Real Housewives Ultimate Girls Trip which was filmed in late 2021 at Dorinda Medley's Blue Stone Manor in The Berkshires.

Glanville is allegedly in talks to return to The Real Housewives of Beverly Hills in a cast 'shake-up' for its upcoming thirteenth season, after the departures of veteran housewife Lisa Rinna and newcomer Sanela Diana Jenkins.

In 2015, Glanville competed on the seventh season of Celebrity Apprentice, where she was fired two weeks before the finale. She appeared on the E! reality series Famously Single in 2016. In 2017, Glanville competed with Dean Sheremet on the FOX reality cooking series My Kitchen Rules, where they finished in third place. That same year, she took part as a housemate on season 20 of Celebrity Big Brother UK. She was the fourth housemate to be evicted on Day 18. In 2018, Glanville took part as a HouseGuest on season 1 of Celebrity Big Brother U.S. She was the fifth HouseGuest to be evicted on Day 24. She also appeared on the second season of Marriage Boot Camp: Reality Stars Family Edition with her father, Guy Glanville.

In 2013, she co-hosted an episode of CNN anchorman Anderson Cooper's talk show Anderson. In February 2013, she worked as a fashion correspondent and hosted the Academy Awards for ABC's On the Red Carpet. In 2013, she also appeared as herself on The CW's teen drama series 90210, in the episode "Dude, Where's My Husband?". She portrayed Erica in Lifetime's television film Missing at 17 (2013), Housewife Veronica in comedy film The Hungover Games (2014) and Tech Whitley in Syfy's disaster television film Sharknado: The 4th Awakens (2016).

In 2023, Glanville appeared as a contestant on Peacock's reality TV series The Traitors. However, she was absent from The Traitors reunion. Additionally, Bravo and Peacock confirmed that Glanville would be returning for the fourth season of The Real Housewives Ultimate Girls Trip, with other returning cast members Phaedra Parks, Vicki Gunvalson, and Eva Marcille. Glanville was allegedly removed from filming after an altercation with original The Real Housewives of New Jersey alum Caroline Manzo.

Books and writing
In February 2013, Glanville released a book with Leslie Bruce, Drinking and Tweeting: And Other Brandi Blunders, which became a #1 New York Times bestseller. LA Weekly called the book "the best piece of celeb literature we've ever come across." People magazine also gave the book a positive review by writing: "Yet as crazy as she might come off here (and on TV), she's strangely relatable, like someone it would be really fun to have drinks with." Glanville's second book with Leslie Bruce, Drinking and Dating: P.S. Social Media Is Ruining Romance was published on February 11, 2014. The book focuses on her relationships and dating life as a single mother.

In 2014, Glanville wrote a weekly column for an Australian celebrity magazine NW.

Other ventures 
Glanville is popular on social media and endorses products such as beauty and wellness products on Instagram. She has partnered with several brands, including Hand MD Skincare hand care range, Lifeline Skin Care products, FabFitFun beauty subscription box, Teami Blends teas and Singles Swag subscription box. On November 4, 2013, Glanville began a weekly podcast show entitled Brandi Glanville Unfiltered. On the podcast Glanville discusses her life, popular culture, and holds interviews with various personalities.

Glanville's Sonoma County Chardonnay titled "Unfiltered Blonde" was launched in partnership with Rippey Wine Company in April 2015. The wine received a bronze medal in the Celebrity Wine Division at the 2015 Los Angeles International Wine Awards and was rated 90 points by Wine Enthusiast Magazine. She has also created an Android mobile application called Blunder Block.

On July 7, 2022, Glanville debuted her first single named "Life of a Housewife" under the name B-Geezy.

Philanthropy 
Glanville served as the Celebrity Grand Marshal at the Sacramento Pride in June 2013. In July 2013, Glanville and Charitybuzz organized a charity project auctioning off a chance to spend an entire day with her, valued at $10,000. Proceeds from the auction benefited The Foundation For Living Beauty, which provides free services to help women with cancer and cancer survivors. She supported the David Foster Foundation Miracle Gala and Concert in Calgary on September 27, 2014.

She supports children's charity Make-a-Wish Foundation and chose the latter as her charity of choice when competing on Celebrity Apprentice. Through Celebrity Apprentice, she was able to secure a donation of $80,000 to the foundation. In December 2014, she promoted and encouraged the sales of Make-a-Wish Foundation's holiday cards on Facebook, Twitter and her official Bravo blog. In April 2015, she participated in Make-a-Wish Foundation's "Walk for Wishes" charity walk and had a personal goal of raising $15,000 for the organization. She received a Woman's Achievement Award from Associates for Breast and Prostate Cancer Studies based in California on May 6, 2015. In June 2017, Glanville participated in a bachelor auction with television personality Eden Sassoon. The event raised money for the breast cancer organization Susan G. Komen, as part of the Babes For Boobs charity event.

In March 2018, Glanville, Carole Radziwill and Teresa Giudice participated in "An Evening With Celebrity Housewives" charity event at The Ridgefield Playhouse. Proceeds from the event's meet and greet tickets benefited actress Mariska Hargitay's Joyful Heart Foundation.

Personal life
In 2001, Glanville married actor Eddie Cibrian. Cibrian and Glanville have two sons, Mason and Jake. The couple announced their separation in July 2009 when it was revealed Cibrian had begun an affair with country music singer LeAnn Rimes, after they appeared together in the movie Northern Lights. Cibrian and Glanville's divorce was finalized on September 30, 2010. The circumstances surrounding the affair and divorce were a part of Glanville's book Drinking and Tweeting: And Other Brandi Blunders. In a 2013 interview, Glanville commented, "Marriages break up all the time. People have affairs. Happens every day. It matters how you handle yourself after and if you're actually remorseful. I've never found LeAnn to be remorseful. I found her to be like, 'Nah-nah-nah-nah-nah, I got your family.'"

In 2015, Glanville was sued by model and fellow Real Housewife Joanna Krupa for defamation related to comments made by Glanville on Watch What Happens Live. The lawsuit was settled in 2017 for $500,000.00, and Glanville issued a public apology to Krupa.

Bibliography 
 Drinking and Tweeting: And Other Brandi Blunders (2013) 
 Drinking and Dating: P.S. Social Media Is Ruining Romance (2014)

Filmography

References

External links 
 

1972 births
21st-century American non-fiction writers
21st-century American women writers
American bloggers
American expatriates in France
American podcasters
American women bloggers
American women non-fiction writers
Female models from California
Living people
People from Sacramento, California
People from Salinas, California
Television personalities from California
The Apprentice (franchise) contestants
The Real Housewives cast members
Writers from California
American women podcasters